Pseudohylesinus is a genus of crenulate bark beetles in the family Curculionidae. There are at least 20 described species in Pseudohylesinus.

Species
These 22 species belong to the genus Pseudohylesinus:

References

Further reading

 
 
 
 
 
 

Scolytinae